Maillane is a commune in the Bouches-du-Rhône department in southern France in the former province of Provence.

Geography

Population

People
Maillane was the birthplace of the 19th century poet Frédéric Mistral (1904 Nobel Prize in literature).

See also
 Communes of the Bouches-du-Rhône department

References

Communes of Bouches-du-Rhône
Bouches-du-Rhône communes articles needing translation from French Wikipedia